Agdestis is a genus of flowering plants containing a single species Agdestis clematidea, a vine native to Florida, Texas, Mexico, and Central America. Its common name rockroot refers to the large boulder-like root.

Taxonomy
Agdestis is usually placed in the Phytolaccaceae family. Its classification is uncertain, however, as several studies of molecular phylogenetics have found it to be possibly the sister taxon of Sarcobatus, also of uncertain classification and often placed in its own family, Sarcobataceae.

References

External links

 
Monotypic Caryophyllales genera
Taxa named by José Mariano Mociño
Taxa named by Martín Sessé y Lacasta
Taxa named by Alphonse Pyramus de Candolle